Zimmernsupra is a municipality in the district of Gotha, in Thuringia, Germany.

History
Within the German Empire (1871–1918), Zimmernsupra was part of the Prussian Province of Saxony.

References

Gotha (district)